is a Japanese mixed martial artist currently competing in the Welterweight division. He has officially 111 professional fights, making him one of the most experienced mixed martial artists ever. He has also competed for the UFC, PRIDE, Sengoku, Palace Fighting Championships, BodogFIGHT, and DEEP. He has competed overseas only four times, and holds a record of 2–2. He is the former Pancrase Light Heavyweight Champion as well as the former Pancrase Middleweight Champion.

Background
Kondo is from Niigata, Japan, began Shorinji Kempo in high school, and is currently a second dan rank.

Mixed martial arts career

Pancrase
Kondo made his professional debut for the Pancrase organization in Japan in early 1996 when he was 21 years old at the Pancrase: Truth 1. His decision to compete for Pancrase was heavily influenced by Masakatsu Funaki being the co-founder, as Kondo looked up to the professional wrestler Funaki. Kondo won his debut by a guillotine choke submission in the first round and would go to reach a 7–0–1 record, before he was handed his first career loss by Jason DeLucia in a decision. He would then defeat DeLucia in a rematch via toe hold submission. All but one of Kondo's first 38 career fights were under the Pancrase banner, and he held a record of 31-4-3 with wins over Minoru Suzuki, Semmy Schilt (2x), Keiichiro Yamamiya (2x), Pete Williams, Guy Mezger, Masakatsu Funaki, Ikuhisa Minowa, Jason DeLucia, Kazuo Takahashi, and Manabu Yamada before making his UFC debut.

UFC
Kondo made his UFC and overseas debut on September 22, 2000 at UFC 27 in New Orleans, Louisiana against Brazilian Alexandre Dantas. Kondo won via TKO in the third round in a highly-entertaining bout. Kondo then fought for the UFC Light Heavyweight Championship Tito Ortiz, who would be making his first title defense at UFC 29 in Japan. After rocking Ortiz with a flying knee early in the fight, Kondo would lose the bout via cobra choke submission at 1:52 into the first round. Three fights later, Kondo returned to the UFC at UFC 32 to face Vladimir Matyushenko and lost via unanimous decision.

Post-UFC
Kondo then received his second consecutive unanimous decision loss in his debut for the DEEP organization in Japan against Paulo Filho. Kondo then went 8-1-3 with wins over Akihoro Gono and Josh Barnett before facing Sanae Kikuta for the Light Heavyweight King of Pancrase title. The two had fought to a draw two fights before but Kondo won the rematch via knockout in the third round before making his debut in the PRIDE organization.

PRIDE
Kondo made his PRIDE debut against Mario Sperry at Pride Shockwave 2003 on December 31, 2003 and won via TKO in the first round. He returned three fights later to face Wanderlei Silva at Pride Final Conflict 2004 and was dominated, losing by knockout in the first round after he was stomped repeatedly by Silva. This was the first time Kondo had lost by knockout or technical knockout in his career. Kondo would then go on to lose his next five bouts with the organization, including a rematch with Akihiro Gono and another knockout loss at the hands of Phil Baroni at Pride Bushido 10.

Return to Pancrase
After the loss to Gono, Kondo went 8–1–1, with wins over Trevor Prangley and Yuki Sasaki, dropping down to the Middleweight division in between fights before becoming the Middleweight King of Pancrase with a unanimous decision win over Ichiro Kanai. After a unanimous decision loss in Cage Force to Rikuhei Fujii, Kondo faced Fujii in a rematch for Kondo's Pancrase title, and Kondo lost again via unanimous decision.

Championships and accomplishments
Pancrase Hybrid Wrestling
Pancrase 1996 Truth Tour Neo Blood Tournament winner
Pancrase Light Heavyweight Championship (One time)
One successful title defense
Pancrase Middleweight Championship (One time)
One successful title defense
Pancrase Interim Middleweight Championship (One time)
Three successful title defenses
Pancrase Openweight Championship (Two times)
Two combined successful title defenses
Tokyo Sports
Rookie of the Year (1996) 
Technique Award (1997)

Mixed martial arts record

|-
|Win
|align=center| 65–37–9
|Tetsuya Izuchi
|Decision (unanimous)
|GLEAT MMA Ver.0
|
|align=center| 3
|align=center| 5:00
|Tokyo, Japan 
|
|-
| Win
| align=center| 64–37–9
| Kazuhito Suzuki
|Decision (unanimous)
|  Pancrase 327
| 
|align=center|3
|align=center|5:00
| Tokyo, Japan
| 
|-
| Loss
| align=center| 63–37–9
|Kazuki
|Decision (unanimous)
|Pancrase 325
|
|align=center|3
|align=center|5:00
|Tokyo, Japan
|
|-
| Win
| align=center| 63–36–9
| Yoshinori Suzuki
| Decision (split)
| Pancrase 321
| 
| align=center| 3
| align=center| 5:00
| Tokyo, Japan
|
|-
| Loss
| align=center| 62–36–9
| Yutaka Kobayashi
| Decision (unanimous)
| Pancrase 319
| 
| align=center| 3
| align=center| 5:00
| Tokyo, Japan
|
|-
| Win
| align=center| 62–35–9
| Futoshi Mochibin
| TKO (punches)
| Ismos 1
| 
| align=center| 1
| align=center| 4:08
| Yokohama, Japan
|
|-
| Loss
| align=center| 61–35–9
| Akihiro Murayama
| Decision (unanimous)
| Pancrase 312
| 
| align=center| 3
| align=center| 5:00
| Tokyo, Japan
|
|-
| Win
| align=center| 61–34–9
| Akihiro Gono
| Decision (unanimous)
| Pancrase 305
| 
| align=center| 3
| align=center| 3:00
| Tokyo, Japan
|
|-
| Loss
| align=center| 60–34–9
| Renzo Gracie
| Submission (rear-naked choke)
| ONE Championship: Reign of Kings
| 
| align=center| 2
| align=center| 1:40
| Manila, Philippines
|Middleweight bout.
|-
| Loss
| align=center| 60–33–9
| Jutaro Nakao
| TKO (punches)
| Pancrase vs. DEEP
| 
| align=center| 2
| align=center| 0:57
| Hyogo, Japan
|
|-
| Win
| align=center| 60–32–9
| Ikuhisa Minowa
| Decision (unanimous)
| Pancrase 288
| 
| align=center| 3
| align=center| 3:00
| Tokyo, Japan
|
|-
| Loss
| align=center| 
| Takaaki Nara
| Decision (unanimous)
| Pancrase 285
| 
| align=center| 3
| align=center| 3:00
| Tokyo, Japan
|
|-
| Loss
| align=center| 59–31–9
| Akihiro Takanabe
| Decision (unanimous)
| Pancrase 279
| 
| align=center| 3
| align=center| 3:00
| Tokyo, Japan
|
|-
| Win
| align=center| 59–30–9
| Kenji Kawaguchi
| KO (punch)
| Pancrase 271
| 
| align=center| 1
| align=center| 3:52
| Tokyo, Japan
|Open Weight bout.
|-
| Loss
| align=center| 58–30–9
| Shingo Suzuki
| TKO (punches)
| Pancrase 265
| 
| align=center| 1
| align=center| 4:56
| Tokyo, Japan
|
|-
| Loss
| align=center| 58–29–9
| Gota Yamashita
| Decision (unanimous)
| Pancrase 263
| 
| align=center| 3
| align=center| 5:00
| Tokyo, Japan
| 
|-
| Win
| align=center| 58–28–9
| Eiji Ishikawa
| TKO (punches)
| Pancrase 260
| 
| align=center| 1
| align=center| 0:39
| Tokyo, Japan
|
|-
| Win
| align=center| 57–28–9
| Masayuki Naruse
| Decision (majority)
| Pancrase 257
| 
| align=center| 2
| align=center| 5:00
| Yokohama, Kanagawa, Japan
|Open Weight bout.
|-
| Win
| align=center| 56–28–9
| Toshikazu Suzuki
| KO (head kick)
| Pancrase 256
| 
| align=center| 1
| align=center| 1:15
| |Tokyo, Japan
|
|-
| Draw
| align=center| 55–28–9
| Eric Michael Fought
| Draw (majority)	
| Pancrase 253
| 
| align=center| 2
| align=center| 5:00
| |Tokyo, Japan
|
|-
| Loss
| align=center| 55–28–8
| Akihiro Murayama
| Decision (unanimous)	
| Pancrase 248
| 
| align=center| 3
| align=center| 5:00
| |Differ Ariake, Tokyo, Japan
|
|-
| Win
| align=center| 55–27–8
| Hiromitsu Kanehara
| Decision (points)
| U-Spirits: U-Spirits Again
| 
| align=center| 1
| align=center| 20:00
| |Korakuen Hall, Tokyo, Japan
|
|-
| Win
| align=center| 54–27–8
| Kosei Kubota
| KO (punch)
| Pancrase Progress Tour 12: All Eyes on Yuki Kondo
| 
| align=center| 1
| align=center| 0:52
| |Tokyo, Japan
|
|-
| Loss
| align=center| 53–27–8
| Kenji Nagaki	
| TKO (corner stoppage)	
| Pancrase Progress Tour 1
| 
| align=center| 2
| align=center| 2:40
| |Tokyo, Japan
|
|-
| Win
| align=center| 53–26–8
| Yuta Nakamura	
| Decision (unanimous)	
| Pancrase: Impressive Tour 10
| 
| align=center| 2
| align=center| 5:00
| |Tokyo, Japan
|
|-
| Loss
| align=center| 52–26–8
| Hiroki Nagaoka	
| Decision (unanimous)	
| Pancrase: Impressive Tour 1
| 
| align=center| 2
| align=center| 5:00
| Tokyo, Japan
|Return to Welterweight.
|-
| Loss
| align=center| 52–25–8
| Rikuhei Fujii
| Decision (unanimous)
| Pancrase: Passion Tour 11
| 
| align=center| 3
| align=center| 5:00
| Tokyo, Japan
| 
|-
| Loss
| align=center| 52–24–8
| Rikuhei Fujii
| Decision (unanimous)
| GCM: Cage Force 19
| 
| align=center| 3
| align=center| 5:00
| Tokyo, Japan
|
|-
| Draw
| align=center| 52–23–8
| Yuji Hisamatsu
| Draw
| Pancrase: Passion Tour 6
| 
| align=center| 3
| align=center| 5:00
| Tokyo, Japan
| 
|-
| Win
| align=center| 52–23–7
| Ichiro Kanai
| Decision (unanimous)
| Pancrase: Passion Tour 4
| 
| align=center| 3
| align=center| 5:00
| Tokyo, Japan
| 
|-
| Win
| align=center| 51–23–7
| Takenori Sato
| Decision (unanimous)
| Pancrase: Passion Tour 1
| 
| align=center| 3
| align=center| 5:00
| Tokyo, Japan
|
|-
| Draw
| align=center| 50–23–7
| Yuji Hisamatsu
| Draw (unanimous)
| Pancrase: Changing Tour 6
| 
| align=center| 3
| align=center| 5:00
| Tokyo, Japan
|
|-
| Win
| align=center| 50–23–6
| Ki Bum Kim
| TKO (kick to the body and punches)
| Pancrase: Changing Tour 4
| 
| align=center| 1
| align=center| 1:52
| Tokyo, Japan
|Welterweight debut.
|-
| Loss
| align=center| 49–23–6
| Yuki Sasaki
| Submission (rear-naked choke)
| World Victory Road Presents: Sengoku 5
| 
| align=center| 2
| align=center| 1:08
| Tokyo, Japan
|
|-
| Win
| align=center| 49–22–6
| Ryuji Ohori
| KO (soccer kick)
| Pancrase: Shining 6
| 
| align=center| 2
| align=center| 2:41
| Tokyo, Japan
|Return to Middleweight.
|-
| Loss
| align=center| 48–22–6
| Roger Gracie
| Submission (rear-naked choke)
| World Victory Road Presents: Sengoku 2
| 
| align=center| 1
| align=center| 2:40
| Tokyo, Japan
|
|-
| Loss
| align=center| 48–21–6
| Keiichiro Yamamiya
| Decision (majority)
| Pancrase: Shining 3
| 
| align=center| 3
| align=center| 5:00
| Tokyo, Japan
|
|-
| Win
| align=center| 48–20–6
| August Wallen
| Decision (unanimous)
| PFP: Ring of Fire
| 
| align=center| 3
| align=center| 5:00
| Manila, Philippines
|
|-
| Win
| align=center| 47–20–6
| Yuji Sakuragi
| Decision (unanimous)
| Pancrase: Rising 8
| 
| align=center| 3
| align=center| 5:00
| Tokyo, Japan
|
|-
| Loss
| align=center| 46–20–6
| Trevor Prangley
| TKO (doctor stoppage)
| BodogFIGHT: Alvarez vs. Lee
| 
| align=center| 2
| align=center| 5:00
| Trenton, New Jersey, United States
|
|-
| Loss
| align=center| 46–19–6
| Akihiro Gono
| Decision (split)
| PRIDE FC: Shockwave 2006
| 
| align=center| 2
| align=center| 5:00
| Saitama, Japan
|Middleweight bout.
|-
| Win
| align=center| 46–18–6
| Ian Nai
| Submission (rear-naked choke)
| Pancrase: Blow 11
| 
| align=center| 1
| align=center| 1:30
| Tokyo, Japan
|
|-
| Draw
| align=center| 45–18–6
| Jean-François Lénogue
| Draw
| Pancrase: Blow 8
| 
| align=center| 3
| align=center| 5:00
| Osaka, Japan
|
|-
| Win
| align=center| 45–18–5
| Daijiro Matsui
| Decision (unanimous)
| Pancrase: Blow 6
| 
| align=center| 3
| align=center| 5:00
| Yokohama, Kanagawa, Japan
| 
|-
| Loss
| align=center| 44–18–5
| Phil Baroni
| KO (punch)
| PRIDE: Bushido 10
| 
| align=center| 1
| align=center| 0:25
| Tokyo, Japan
|Middleweight bout.
|-
| Loss
| align=center| 44–17–5
| Kazuhiro Nakamura
| Decision (unanimous)
| PRIDE FC: Shockwave 2005
| 
| align=center| 3
| align=center| 5:00
| Saitama, Japan
|
|-
| Win
| align=center| 44–16–5
| Hiromitsu Kanehara
| Decision (unanimous)
| Pancrase: Spiral 8
| 
| align=center| 3
| align=center| 5:00
| Yokohama, Kanagawa, Japan
|
|-
| Loss
| align=center| 43–16–5
| Igor Vovchanchyn
| Decision (unanimous)
| PRIDE FC: Total Elimination 2005
| 
| align=center| 3
| align=center| 5:00
| Osaka, Japan
|
|-
| Loss
| align=center| 43–15–5
| Dan Henderson
| Decision (split)
| PRIDE Shockwave 2004
| 
| align=center| 3
| align=center| 5:00
| Saitama, Japan
|
|-
| Win
| align=center| 43–14–5
| Evangelista Santos
| Decision (unanimous)
| Pancrase: Brave 10
| 
| align=center| 3
| align=center| 5:00
| Urayasu, Chiba, Japan
|
|-
| Loss
| align=center| 42–14–5
| Wanderlei Silva
| KO (stomps)
| PRIDE Final Conflict 2004
| 
| align=center| 1
| align=center| 2:46
| Saitama, Japan
|
|-
| Win
| align=center| 42–13–5
| Shannon Ritch
| Submission (kneebar)
| Pancrase: Brave 6
| 
| align=center| 1
| align=center| 1:01
| Tokyo, Japan
|
|-
| Win
| align=center| 41–13–5
| Steve Heath
| Submission (rear-naked choke)
| Pancrase: Brave 3
| 
| align=center| 1
| align=center| 4:01
| Tokyo, Japan
|Heavyweight bout.
|-
| Win
| align=center| 40–13–5
| Mario Sperry
| TKO (doctor stoppage)
| PRIDE Shockwave 2003
| 
| align=center| 1
| align=center| 3:27
| Saitama, Japan
|
|-
| Win
| align=center| 39–13–5
| Sanae Kikuta
| KO (punch)
| Pancrase: Hybrid 10
| 
| align=center| 3
| align=center| 0:08
| Tokyo, Japan
| 
|-
| Loss
| align=center| 38–13–5
| Josh Barnett
| Submission (rear-naked choke)
| Pancrase: 10th Anniversary Show
| 
| align=center| 3
| align=center| 3:26
| Tokyo, Japan
|Heavyweight bout.
|-
| Draw
| align=center| 38–12–5
| Sanae Kikuta
| Draw
| Pancrase: Hybrid 5
| 
| align=center| 3
| align=center| 5:00
| Yokohama, Kanagawa, Japan
|
|-
| Win
| align=center| 38–12–4
| Sumio Koyano
| TKO (corner stoppage)
| Pancrase: Hybrid 3
| 
| align=center| 1
| align=center| 3:58
| Tokyo, Japan
|
|-
| Draw
| align=center| 37–12–4
| Gabriel Vella
| Draw
| Pancrase: Hybrid 1
| 
| align=center| 2
| align=center| 5:00
| Tokyo, Japan
|
|-
| Win
| align=center| 37–12–3
| Tsuyoshi Kurihara
| Submission (rear-naked choke)
| Pancrase: Spirit 9
| 
| align=center| 1
| align=center| 4:49
| Tokyo, Japan
|
|-
| Win
| align=center| 36–12–3
| Yoshinori Momose
| Submission (punches)
| Pancrase: 2002 Neo-Blood Tournament Opening Round
| 
| align=center| 2
| align=center| 3:51
| Tokyo, Japan
|
|-
| Loss
| align=center| 35–12–3
| Yoshinori Momose
| Decision (majority)
| Premium Challenge
| 
| align=center| 1
| align=center| 10:00
| Tokyo, Japan
|
|-
| Win
| align=center| 35–11–3
| Nestor Martinez
| Submission (armbar)
| Deep: 4th Impact
| 
| align=center| 1
| align=center| 1:58
| Nagoya, Aichi, Japan
|
|-
| Win
| align=center| 34–11–3
| Eiji Ishikawa
| Decision (unanimous)
| Pancrase: Spirit 2
| 
| align=center| 2
| align=center| 5:00
| Osaka, Japan
|Middleweight bout.
|-
| Win
| align=center| 33–11–3
| Mitsuyoshi Sato
| TKO (punches)
| Pancrase: Spirit 1
| 
| align=center| 2
| align=center| 0:32
| Tokyo, Japan
|
|-
| Win
| align=center| 32–11–3
| Akihiro Gono
| TKO (corner stoppage)
| Pancrase: Proof 7
| 
| align=center| 3
| align=center| 0:52
| Yokohama, Kanagawa, Japan
|
|-
| Loss
| align=center| 31–11–3
| Paulo Filho
| Decision (unanimous)
| DEEP: 2nd Impact
| 
| align=center| 3
| align=center| 5:00
| Yokohama, Kanagawa, Japan
|
|-
| Loss
| align=center| 31–10–3
| Vladimir Matyushenko
| Decision (unanimous)
| UFC 32
| 
| align=center| 5
| align=center| 5:00
| East Rutherford, New Jersey, United States
| 
|-
| Win
| align=center| 31–9–3
| Brian Gassaway
| Submission (toe hold)
| Pancrase: Proof 2
| 
| align=center| 1
| align=center| 1:45
| Kadoma, Osaka, Japan
|
|-
| Win
| align=center| 30–9–3
| Eiji Ishikawa
| TKO (doctor stoppage)
| Pancrase: Proof 1
| 
| align=center| 3
| align=center| 4:16
| Tokyo, Japan
|Heavyweight bout.
|-
| Loss
| align=center| 29–9–3
| Tito Ortiz
| Submission (cobra choke)
| UFC 29
| 
| align=center| 1
| align=center| 1:52
| Tokyo, Japan
| 
|-
| Win
| align=center| 29–8–3
| Alexandre Dantas
| TKO (strikes)
| UFC 27
| 
| align=center| 3
| align=center| 2:28
| New Orleans, Louisiana, United States
|Middleweight debut.
|-
| Win
| align=center| 28–8–3
| Dan Theodore
| Submission (kneebar)
| Pancrase: 2000 Neo-Blood Tournament Opening Round
| 
| align=center| 1
| align=center| 3:08
| Tokyo, Japan
|
|-
| Win
| align=center| 27–8–3
| Saulo Ribeiro
| TKO (punches)
| Colosseum 2000
| 
| align=center| 1
| align=center| 0:22
| Japan
|Heavyweight bout.
|-
| Win
| align=center| 26–8–3
| Manabu Yamada
| Decision (unanimous)
| Pancrase: Trans 1
| 
| align=center| 1
| align=center| 10:00
| Tokyo, Japan
|Light Heavyweight debut.
|-
| Loss
| align=center| 25–8–3
| Semmy Schilt
| Submission (rear-naked choke)
| Pancrase: Breakthrough 10
| 
| align=center| 1
| align=center| 2:28
| Kadoma, Osaka, Japan
|
|-
| Win
| align=center| 25–7–3
| Kiuma Kunioku
| KO (flying knee and palm strikes)
| Pancrase: 1999 Anniversary Show
| 
| align=center| 1
| align=center| 0:34
| Urayasu, Chiba, Japan
|
|-
| Win
| align=center| 24–7–3
| Jason Godsey
| Submission (toe hold)
| Pancrase: 1999 Neo-Blood Tournament Opening Round
| 
| align=center| 1
| align=center| 5:08
| Tokyo, Japan
|
|-
| Win
| align=center| 23–7–3
| Daisuke Watanabe
| KO (punch)
| Pancrase: Breakthrough 7
| 
| align=center| 1
| align=center| 0:21
| Tokyo, Japan
|
|-
| Win
| align=center| 22–7–3
| Semmy Schilt
| Decision (lost points)
| Pancrase: Breakthrough 4
| 
| align=center| 1
| align=center| 20:00
| Yokohama, Kanagawa, Japan
| 
|-
| Loss
| align=center| 21–7–3
| Kiuma Kunioku
| Decision (unanimous)
| Pancrase: Breakthrough 3
| 
| align=center| 1
| align=center| 15:00
| Tokyo, Japan
|
|-
| Win
| align=center| 21–6–3
| Satoshi Hasegawa
| TKO (palm strike)
| Pancrase: Breakthrough 1
| 
| align=center| 1
| align=center| 0:48
| Tokyo, Japan
|
|-
| Loss
| align=center| 20–6–3
| Guy Mezger
| Decision (majority)
| Pancrase: Advance 12
| 
| align=center| 1
| align=center| 20:00
| Urayasu, Chiba, Japan
|
|-
| Win
| align=center| 20–5–3
| Daisuke Ishii
| Submission (toe hold)
| Pancrase: Advance 9
| 
| align=center| 1
| align=center| 2:38
| Tokyo, Japan
|
|-
| Win
| align=center| 19–5–3
| Osami Shibuya
| Decision (split)
| Pancrase: 1998 Anniversary Show
| 
| align=center| 1
| align=center| 20:00
| Tokyo, Japan
|
|-
| Draw
| align=center| 18–5–3
| Ryushi Yanagisawa
| Draw (unanimous)
| Pancrase: 1998 Neo-Blood Tournament Second Round
| 
| align=center| 1
| align=center| 20:00
| Amori, Japan
|
|-
| Win
| align=center| 18–5–2
| Keiichiro Yamamiya
| Decision (majority)
| Pancrase: Advance 5
| 
| align=center| 1
| align=center| 20:00
| Yokohama, Kanagawa, Japan
|
|-
| Draw
| align=center| 17–5–2
| Kiuma Kunioku
| Draw (majority)
| Pancrase: Advance 2
| 
| align=center| 2
| align=center| 3:00
| Yokohama, Kanagawa, Japan
|
|-
| Loss
| align=center| 17–5–1
| Masakatsu Funaki
| Submission (triangle kimura)
| Pancrase: Alive 11
| 
| align=center| 1
| align=center| 2:20
| Tokyo, Japan
|
|-
| Win
| align=center| 17–4–1
| Kazuo Takahashi
| Submission (arm-triangle choke)
| Pancrase: Alive 10
| 
| align=center| 1
| align=center| 7:27
| Kobe, Hyogo, Japan
|
|-
| Win
| align=center| 16–4–1
| Leon van Dijk
| Decision (unanimous)
| Pancrase: Alive 9
| 
| align=center| 1
| align=center| 20:00
| Tokyo, Japan
|
|-
| Win
| align=center| 15–4–1
| Jason DeLucia
| Submission (toe hold)
| Pancrase: 1997 Anniversary Show
| 
| align=center| 1
| align=center| 27:22
| Urayasu, Chiba, Japan
|
|-
| Win
| align=center| 14–4–1
| Ikuhisa Minowa
| Submission (toe hold)
| Pancrase: Alive 8
| 
| align=center| 1
| align=center| 5:13
| Osaka, Japan
|
|-
| Loss
| align=center| 13–4–1
| Jason Godsey
| Submission (neck crank)
| Pancrase: 1997 Neo-Blood Tournament, Round 2
| 
| align=center| 1
| align=center| 8:17
| Tokyo, Japan
|
|-
| Win
| align=center| 13–3–1
| Semmy Schilt
| Decision (unanimous)
| Pancrase: Alive 7
| 
| align=center| 1
| align=center| 20:00
| Hakata, Fukuoka, Japan
|
|-
| Win
| align=center| 12–3–1
| Gary Myers
| Submission (heel hook)
| Pancrase: Alive 5
| 
| align=center| 1
| align=center| 5:35
| Kobe, Hyogo, Japan
|
|-
| Win
| align=center| 11–3–1
| Masakatsu Funaki
| Submission (triangle armbar)
| Pancrase: Alive 4
| 
| align=center| 1
| align=center| 15:12
| Urayasu, Chiba, Japan
|
|-
| Win
| align=center| 10–3–1
| Kim Jong Wang
| Submission (armbar)
| Pancrase: Alive 3
| 
| align=center| 1
| align=center| 0:25
| Nagoya, Aichi, Japan
|
|-
| Win
| align=center| 9–3–1
| Guy Mezger
| Decision (lost points)
| Pancrase: Alive 2
| 
| align=center| 1
| align=center| 20:00
| Urayasu, Chiba, Japan
|
|-
| Win
| align=center| 8–3–1
| Kiuma Kunioku
| Decision (split)
| Pancrase: Alive 1
| 
| align=center| 1
| align=center| 20:00
| Tokyo, Japan
|
|-
| Loss
| align=center| 7–3–1
| Guy Mezger
| Decision (lost points)
| Pancrase: Truth 10
| 
| align=center| 1
| align=center| 20:00
| Tokyo, Japan
|
|-
| Loss
| align=center| 7–2–1
| Masakatsu Funaki
| Submission (rear-naked choke)
| Pancrase: Truth 9
| 
| align=center| 1
| align=center| 1:43
| Kobe, Hyogo, Japan
|
|-
| Loss
| align=center| 7–1–1
| Jason DeLucia
| Decision (lost points)
| Pancrase: Truth 7
| 
| align=center| 1
| align=center| 20:00
| Nagoya, Aichi, Japan
|
|-
| Win
| align=center| 7–0–1
| Frank Shamrock
| KO (head kick)
| Pancrase: 1996 Anniversary Show
| 
| align=center| 1
| align=center| 12:43
| Urayasu, Chiba, Japan
|
|-
| Win
| align=center| 6–0–1
| Pete Williams
| Decision (unanimous)
| Pancrase: 1996 Neo-Blood Tournament, Round 2
| 
| align=center| 1
| align=center| 20:00
| Tokyo, Japan
|
|-
| Win
| align=center| 5–0–1
| Keiichiro Yamamiya
| TKO (palm strikes)
| Pancrase: 1996 Neo-Blood Tournament, Round 2
| 
| align=center| 1
| align=center| 6:16
| Tokyo, Japan
|
|-
| Win
| align=center| 4–0–1
| Semmy Schilt
| Decision (split)
| Pancrase: 1996 Neo-Blood Tournament, Round 1
| 
| align=center| 1
| align=center| 10:00
| Tokyo, Japan
|
|-
| Win
| align=center| 3–0–1
| Minoru Suzuki
| Decision (lost points)
| Pancrase: Truth 6
| 
| align=center| 1
| align=center| 15:00
| Fukuoka, Japan
|
|-
| Draw
| align=center| 2–0–1
| Kiuma Kunioku
| Draw (majority)
| Pancrase: Truth 5
| 
| align=center| 1
| align=center| 10:00
| Tokyo, Japan
|
|-
| Win
| align=center| 2–0
| Osami Shibuya
| Decision (lost points)
| Pancrase: Truth 2
| 
| align=center| 1
| align=center| 10:00
| Kobe, Hyogo, Japan
|
|-
| Win
| align=center| 1–0
| Takafumi Ito
| TKO (guillotine choke)
| Pancrase: Truth 1
| 
| align=center| 1
| align=center| 2:21
| Yokohama, Kanagawa, Japan
|

Mixed martial arts exhibition

|-
| Draw
| align=center| 0–0–1
| Minoru Suzuki
| Technical Draw
| Pancrase 2000 Trans Tour
| 
| align=center| 1
| align=center| 3:00
| Tokyo, Japan
| 
|-

See also
List of Pancrase champions

References

External links
Yuki Kondo Official blog

Pride profile 

1975 births
Living people
Japanese male mixed martial artists
Middleweight mixed martial artists
Light heavyweight mixed martial artists
Mixed martial artists utilizing Shorinji Kempo
Mixed martial artists utilizing catch wrestling
Japanese catch wrestlers
Japanese male karateka
People from Nagaoka, Niigata
Ultimate Fighting Championship male fighters